Phyllosticta batatas is a fungal plant pathogen infecting sweet potatoes.

References

External links
 USDA ARS Fungal Database

Fungal plant pathogens and diseases
Root vegetable diseases
batatas
Fungi described in 1884